is a series of Formula One video games developed and published by Video System, primarily known for developing the Aero Fighters series. Prior to obtaining the FOCA license, the company previously released an arcade game in 1989 (based on the  season) called Tail to Nose: Great Championship (known in Japan as Super Formula: Chijō Saisoku no Battle). The arcade and SNES games are played with a top-down view centered on the players chosen vehicles. These titles feature the song "Truth" by T-Square, featured branding from Fuji Television's Formula One coverage, and were only released in Japan. Video System also developed SD F-1 Grand Prix, a Super Mario Kart style game featuring animal caricatures of selected  drivers.

In 1998, Video System regained the Formula One license after a three-year break. The later games, named under the F1 World Grand Prix banner, featured a 3D polygon-based simulation-style racing. Some of these titles were also published by Eidos Interactive. Video System is also credited as a publisher for F1 Racing Championship, based on the  season and developed by Ubi Soft.

Games
The following is a list of games released in the series. The first four games was released exclusively in Japan.

Reception
The Super Famicom version of F-1 Grand Prix topped the Japanese Famitsu sales chart in May 1992.

References

External links

1991 video games
Arcade video games
Formula One video games
Hamster Corporation franchises
Racing video games
Super Nintendo Entertainment System games
Video game franchises
Video games developed in Japan
Video System games